Huge Hits 1998 is a compilation album released in November 1998. It is part of the Hits compilation series which began in 1984.

Huge Hits 1998 is an end-of-year compilation that combines the biggest hit singles from other Hits releases from earlier in the year. Upon release, the album reached number 1 in the Compilation Chart and was there for two weeks.

Disc one
 Celine Dion — "My Heart Will Go On"
 Madonna - "Frozen"
 B*Witched - "C'est la Vie"
 Mariah Carey - "My All"
 Five - "Got the Feelin'"
 Robbie Williams - "Let Me Entertain You"
 Steps - "Last Thing on My Mind"
 Boyzone - "Baby Can I Hold You"
 Jennifer Paige - "Crush"
 Another Level - "Be Alone No More"
 All Saints - "Under The Bridge"
 Brandy & Monica - "The Boy Is Mine"
 Wyclef Jean - "Gone till November"
 Will Smith - "Gettin' Jiggy wit It"
 Busta Rhymes - "Turn It Up (Remix)/Fire It Up (Clean)"
 Destiny's Child featuring Wyclef Jean - "No No No (Part 2)"
 Sweetbox - "Everything's Gonna Be Alright"
 Cleopatra - "Cleopatra's Theme"
 Aqua - "Turn Back Time"
 Backstreet Boys - "All I Have to Give"
 Spice Girls - "Stop"

Disc two
 Run–D.M.C. vs. Jason Nevins - "It's Like That"
 The Tamperer featuring Maya - "Feel It"
 Mousse T. vs. Hot 'n' Juicy - "Horny '98"
 Sash! - "La Primavera"
 Dario G - "Carnaval de Paris"
 Jamiroquai - "Deeper Underground"
 Cornershop - "Brimful of Asha (Norman Cook Remix)"
 Apollo 440 - "Lost in Space"
 Manic Street Preachers - "If You Tolerate This Your Children Will Be Next"
 Catatonia - "Mulder and Scully"
 Kula Shaker - "Sound of Drums"
 Space with Cerys Matthews - "The Ballad of Tom Jones"
 Eagle-Eye Cherry - "Save Tonight"
 Natalie Imbruglia - "Smoke"
 The Corrs - "Dreams (Tee's Radio Mix)"
 Simply Red - "Say You Love Me"
 K-Ci & JoJo - "All My Life"
 Des'ree - "Life"
 T-Spoon - "Sex on the Beach"
 Baddiel, Skinner and The Lightning Seeds - "3 Lions '98"

References 

1998 compilation albums
Hits (compilation series) albums